Markus André Kaasa (born 15 July 1997) is a Norwegian professional footballer who plays as a midfielder for Eliteserien club Molde.

Career statistics

Honours
Molde
 Eliteserien: 2022
 Norwegian Cup: 2021–22

References

External links

1997 births
Living people
Norwegian footballers
Association football midfielders
Eliteserien players
Odds BK players
Molde FK players